Anthophora dispar  is a species of bee belonging to the family Apidae subfamily Apinae tribus Anthophorini.

Description

The body is densely hairy. The middle legs of males are very elongated with long tufts of black hairs on the tarsi. Males and females have a different pattern and color so that they seem to belong to two distinct species (hence the Latin name "dispar"). In the females the brushes for collecting pollen on their hind legs are red and the abdomen shows white stripes, while it is black in males.

Distribution

They are present in most of France, Italy, Hungary and in North Africa.

External links
 Biolib
 Fauna Europaea

Apinae
Insects described in 1841